The New Hampshire Regiment was formed when the 1st New Hampshire Regiment was redesignated on 1 March 1783 of nine companies of volunteers. The regiment was consolidated with the New Hampshire Battalion (2nd New Hampshire Regiment) on 22 June 1783 as five companies and re-designated as the New Hampshire Battalion.

See also
1st New Hampshire Regiment
5th Continental Regiment
New Hampshire Battalion

References

External links
Bibliography of the Continental Army in New Hampshire compiled by the United States Army Center of Military History

New Hampshire Regiment
Military units and formations established in 1783
Military units and formations disestablished in 1783